Hyblaea subcaerulea is a moth in the family Hyblaeidae described by Prout in 1922.

References

Hyblaeidae